Jules Blanchard (25 May 1832 – 2 May 1916) was a French sculptor.

Blanchard was born in Puiseaux. He was the son-in-law of sculptor Denis Foyatier. He was a student of François Jouffroy.  Blanchard is perhaps best known for his renovation of the Fontaine du Palmier in the Place du Châtelet, Paris.

Selected works

 La Bocca della verità (La bouche de la vérité) (1871), statue, marble, Paris, Jardin du Luxembourg
 Andromède (Salon de 1892), statue,  Paris, Jardin du Luxembourg
 La Science (commande de 1882), statue, bronze, Paris, by the Hôtel de Ville, Paris
 Boccador, Paris, by the Hôtel de Ville
 Four caryatids, on the facade of the Hôtel de Ville
 Un jeune équilibriste (Salon de 1866), plaster
 Jeune Fille parlant au Sphinx, mairie de Puiseaux

1832 births
1916 deaths
20th-century French sculptors
20th-century French male artists
19th-century French male artists
19th-century French sculptors
French male sculptors